Giro di Sardegna (Tour of Sardinia) was a stage road bicycle race held on the island of Sardinia, an Italian region. It was rated 2.1 on the UCI Europe Tour. The race returned in 2009 after 11 years, but only lasted a further three editions before being cancelled due to budgetary problems in 2012.

Winners

References

Men's road bicycle races
Recurring sporting events established in 1958
1958 establishments in Italy
Defunct cycling races in Italy
UCI Europe Tour races
Sport in Sardinia
Cycle races in Italy
2011 disestablishments in Italy
Recurring sporting events disestablished in 2011